Located in central South Africa, the Free State Parks are the responsibility of the Department of Economic Development, Tourism and Environmental Affairs of the Free State Province.

Free State

National Parks

 Golden Gate Highlands National Park, incorporating the former QwaQwa National Park.

World Heritage Sites
 Vredefort Dome

Private and Other Parks
 Caledon Nature Reserve around the Welbedacht Dam.
 Erfenis Dam Nature Reserve
 Gariep Nature Reserve formerly known as Hendrik Verwoerd Dam Nature Reserve, on the Free State side of the Gariep Dam; the park on the Eastern Cape side of the dam is named the Oviston Nature Reserve.
 Kalkfontein Nature Reserve around the Kalkfontein Dam.
 Koppies Dam Nature Reserve
 Laohu Valley Reserve
 Maria Moroka Nature Reserve
 Paul Saunders Nature Reserve
 Rolfontein Nature Reserve around the Vanderkloof Dam.
 Rustfontein Dam Nature Reserve
 Sandveld Nature Reserve around the Bloemhof Dam (Free State side only); the park on the North West is called the Bloemhof Dam Nature Reserve.
 Seekoei-vlei Nature Reserve
 Sterkfontein Dam Nature Reserve around the Sterkfontein Dam.
 Soetdoring Nature Reserve around the Krugersdrift Dam.
 Tussen-die- Riviere Nature Reserve, near the Gariep Dam.
 Willem Pretorius Game Reserve around the Allemanskraal Dam.

Defunct Park 
 Vaalbos National Park has been closed down.

See also 
Department: Tourism. 
List of municipalities in the Free State
List of protected areas of South Africa

Nature reserves in South Africa